John Dickey (June 23, 1794 – March 14, 1853) was a Whig member of the U.S. House of Representatives from Pennsylvania.

Biography
John Dickey (father of Oliver James Dickey) was born in Greensburg, Pennsylvania.  He was appointed postmaster of Old Brighton, Pennsylvania, on April 11, 1818, and served until May 17, 1821.  He served as sheriff from 1824 to 1827.  He was a member of the Pennsylvania State Senate in 1835 and 1837.

Dickey was elected as a Whig to the Twenty-eighth Congress.  He was again elected to the Thirtieth Congress.  He was appointed United States Marshal for the western district of Pennsylvania on January 22, 1852.  He died in Beaver, Pennsylvania, in 1853.  Interment in the Old Cemetery.

Sources

The Political Graveyard

1794 births
1853 deaths
Pennsylvania state senators
United States Marshals
Whig Party members of the United States House of Representatives from Pennsylvania
19th-century American politicians